Kobets (Cyrillic: Кобец) is an East Slavic surname. Notable people with the surname include:
 Alyaksandr Kobets (born 1981), Belarusian footballer
 Daria Kobets (born 2000), Ukrainian rhythmic gymnast
 Konstantin Kobets (1939–2012), Russian army general
 Oleksandr Kobets (born 1959), Ukrainian politician and businessman

See also
 

Belarusian-language surnames
Russian-language surnames
Ukrainian-language surnames